Right-wing extremist attacks in Berlin-Neukölln have been occurring since May 2016. The threats and attacks target liberal and left-wing citizens and institutions. The incidents were  dismissed as inconsequential, but it seems like they were systematically committed. From 2016 to 2018, 51 attacks were perpetrated.

Background
Neukölln, a district of Berlin is considered multicultural. According to the Berlin constitution protection, right-wing groups in Neukölln are "relatively well-structured." A National Democratic Party of Germany (NPD) district association is active in the district as well as members of the Network of Free Nationalistic Forces. The network was deliberately not a well-organized group, so the investigation and a possible ban would be difficult.

The attacks affected district politicians of the left and the Social Democratic Party (SPD), trade unionists, a bookseller, artists and people helping refugees. The aim of this "anti-antifa work" is to scare people, to intimidate them and to dissuade them from their political work.

Right-wing extremists had carried out a series of attacks in 2011, 2012 and 2013. They were also directed against people who engaged against the right in Neukölln.

Attacks

On 15 May, 2016, there is an attempted arson on the linksqueeren Wagenplatz "channel".
On 8 July 2016, an arson attack on a car in the northern part of neukölln is committed, which was covered with left and anti-l stickers.
On 27 December 2016, the name of a person was sprayed on a house facade in Neukölln and behind it "= Red bastard!"
On 3 May 2017, there had been an arson attack on the car of a Neukölln refugee worker.
On 30 January 2018, an arson attack on the car of the leftist politician Ferat Kocak was committed.
That same night, the car of the bookseller Heinz Ostermann was lit. It was the third stop directed against Ostermann.
On the weekend of 20.-21. In March, several death threats were sprayed in residential buildings in Neukölln. "9 mm for ..." was written in red on two walls, followed by the names of the threatened. In two other cases, people with common names were offended this way. The victims were committed citizens, including an employee of the Mobile Consultation Against Right-Wing Extremism Berlin (MBR).

Response to attacks 
Roughly 800 people marched in Neukölln on 21 December 2019 to protest against neo-Nazis and highlight the rising number of hate crimes and lack of prevention. The march included several leftist and anti-fascist groups with the motto "No place for Nazis from Hermannplatz to Neukölln Town Hall."

References

2016 in Germany
2017 in Germany
Political history of Germany
Politics of Berlin